Toby Glacier is a glacier in the Purcell Mountains of southeastern British Columbia, Canada. Its main drainage basin is Toby Creek. It is located within Purcell Wilderness Conservancy Provincial Park and Protected Area.

See also
Jumbo Glacier, British Columbia

Glaciers of British Columbia
Mountains of British Columbia
East Kootenay
Purcell Mountains